West Melchior Islands is a group of small ice-covered islands and rocks which lie west of The Sound in the Melchior Islands, Palmer Archipelago. The islands east of The Sound are called East Melchior Islands. The name was probably given by DI personnel who roughly surveyed these islands in 1927. The islands were surveyed by Argentine expeditions in 1942, 1943 and 1948.

See also 
 List of Antarctic and sub-Antarctic islands

References 

Islands of the Palmer Archipelago